Montville Township is one of the seventeen townships of Medina County, Ohio, United States.  The 2020 census found 13,131 people in the township.

Geography
Located in the central part of the county, it borders the following townships:
Medina Township - north
Granger Township - northeast corner
Sharon Township - east
Wadsworth Township - southeast corner
Guilford Township - south
Westfield Township - southwest corner
Lafayette Township - west
York Township - northwest corner

Part of the city of Medina, the county seat of Medina County, is located in northwestern Montville Township.

Name and history
Statewide, the only other Montville Township is located in Geauga County.

The land was purchased by General Arisarchus Champion in 1818. He named it after the town in Vermont where he had lived.

The township was established in 1820, less than two years after the first settlers arrived.

1818: Land sold to General Aristarchus Champion
1819: Austin Badger and Samuel Brown settled on land
1820: Montville Township organized
1823: Saw mill constructed by Badger 
1829: First religious service at Episcopal Church
1830: Methodist Church meets in home and school classrooms
1844: Methodist Church built
1850: General Store opened
1873: Musical convention held at Episcopal Church
1879: Pioneer monument of Farifax Smith erected
1890: Northeastern Ohio Railroad built crossing northeastern Montville
1923: All schoolhouses consolidated to one elementary school; high school students bused to Medina
1932: Montville Grange organized

Government
The township is governed by a three-member board of trustees, who are elected in November of odd-numbered years to a four-year term beginning on the following January 1. Two are elected in the year after the presidential election and one is elected in the year before it. There is also an elected township fiscal officer, who serves a four-year term beginning on April 1 of the year after the election, which is held in November of the year before the presidential election. Vacancies in the fiscal officership or on the board of trustees are filled by the remaining trustees. As of 2012, Ronald Bischof, Jeff Bradon, and Sally Albrecht are members of the board of trustees with Bischof serving as chairman and Brandon serving as vice chairman.

Police, fire, and LST personnel operate out of the Ron F. Bischof Safety Services building, which opened in 2011.  Other township business operates out of the Montville Administration Building.

References

External links
Township website
County website
History of Montville Township

Townships in Medina County, Ohio
Townships in Ohio